Miķelis Ļaksa (born 2 October 1986), known professionally as Markus Riva, is a Latvian singer. He has released several albums, including the debut album Ticu (2009).

Riva worked at Capital FM as a DJ, and has composed music for various television shows. Among creative inspirations, he mentions artists such as Beyoncé, Robyn and Woody Allen.

Career 
The English version of the single is called "Take Me Down" and was one of the finalist songs for the Latvian national selection for the Eurovision Song Contest.

2014–2023: Dziesma, Supernova and X Faktors 
He has competed repeatedly in Latvia's national selection for the Eurovision Song Contest. He has entered the Latvian national selection for the past eight editions in a row. In 2015, Riva released his first single in Russian titled "Taty", the video for the single was made by director Alan Badoev. In 2015 he again entered the selection, now called Supernova with a new format. He returned with his song "Take Me Down", the English version of "Taty", which went on to place second in the final, behind the eventual winner Aminata's song "Love Injected". In 2016, Riva entered with his song "I Can", and came third in the semi-final, however since he was in neither the top two in the jury voting or the televote, he did not reach the final. 

Since 2017, Riva has been hosting X Faktors, the Latvian version of The X Factor. The same year, Riva again participated in Supernova, this time with the song "Dynamite". He failed to qualify from the second heat, finishing in sixth place. In 2018, Riva entered again with the song "This Time". Originally, he was said to have failed to qualify from his semi-final, however due to technical errors in the voting he would have qualified over Ritvars' song "Who's Counting", so both songs were sent through to the final. In the final, Riva placed fifth out of eight entries. In 2019, he participated in Supernova with his song "You Make Me So Crazy". Having qualified from the semi-final, he placed second out of 8 entries, behind the eventual winner Carousel's song "That Night". In 2020, he returned for a seventh consecutive year with the song "Impossible", co-written by Aminata. He was not selected to participate following an audition round. He returned to Supernova in 2022 with the song "If You're Gonna Love Me", but didn't qualify to the final. In 2023, he was selected once again to perform the song "Forever", which qualified to the final and placed fourth.

Participations in Latvia's Eurovision National Final

Discography

Studio albums
 Ticu (2009)
 Songs from NYC  (2010)
 How It Feels (2013)
 MR (2015)
 I CAN (2018)
 Laika Upe (2019)

Singles
"Fire" (2013)
"We Dance for Reason" (2014)
"Lights On" (2014)
"Forever" (2014)
"Take Me Down" (2014)
"Таты" (2015)
"Красива сильно" (feat. Arthur Dennys) (2015)
"Take Me Away" (2015)
"I Can" (2016)
"Love Me Harder" (2016)
"Laika Upe" (2016)
"Ты влюблена" (2016)
"Saucu Tevi Vēl" (2016)
"Река любви" (2016)
"Dynamite" (2017)
"Девушка с глянца" (2017)
"Ko sirds mana jūt" (2017)
"Южные ветра" (feat. Arthur Dennys) (2017)
"Не зови" (2017)
"Kā būs, tā būs" (2017)
"This Time" (2017)
"Ziemassvētkos" (2017)
"Куда ночь заведёт" (2018)
"Не відпускай" (with Myata) (2018)
"Nevaru Tā" (2018)
"Свадхистхана" (2018)
"Last Dance" (with Aminata) (2018)
"По венам алкоголь" / "You Make Me So Crazy" (2018)
"Es Tev Šodien Teikšu Jā" (with Intars Busulis and Reinis Sējāns) (2019)
"Kamēr Vien Mēs Esam" (with Dināra Rudāne) (2019)
"Ты пьёшь мою кровь" (2019)
"Не владею собой" (2019)
"Пьяная голая" (2019)
"Impossible" (2020)
"If You're Gonna Love Me" (2022)

References

External links

1986 births
Living people
21st-century Latvian male singers
Latvian pop singers
English-language singers from Latvia
OnlyFans creators
People from Talsi
Russian-language singers